Takimi Wakayama (30 March 1914 – September 1941) was a Japanese water polo player. He competed in the men's tournament at the 1936 Summer Olympics. Conscripted to fight in the Second Sino-Japanese War, he died of typhoid fever on the frontlines in 1941.

References

1914 births
Year of death missing
Japanese male water polo players
Olympic water polo players of Japan
Water polo players at the 1936 Summer Olympics
Sportspeople from Hiroshima
Japanese military personnel killed in action
Military personnel killed in the Second Sino-Japanese War
Deaths from typhoid fever